Ned Wade (1911-4 May 1992) was an Irish hurler who played as a midfielder and as a centre-forward for the Tipperary and Dublin senior teams.

Born in Boherlahan, County Tipperary, Wade first arrived on the inter-county scene at the age of seventeen when he first linked up with the Tipperary minor team before later joining the junior side. He joined the senior panel during the 1931 championship. Wade subsequently joined the Dublin senior team and won three Leinster medals. He was an All-Ireland runner-up on four occasions.

As a member of the Leinster inter-provincial team on a number of occasions, Wade won three Railway Cup medals. At club level he was a seven-time cham pionship medallist with Faughs. He began his club career with Boherlahan–Dualla.

Wade retired from inter-county hurling following the conclusion of the 1946 championship.

Honours

Team

Faughs
Dublin Senior Hurling Championship (7): 1936, 1939, 1940, 1941, 1944, 1945, 1946

Tipperary
All-Ireland Junior Hurling Championship (1): 1930
Munster Junior Hurling Championship (1): 1930
All-Ireland Minor Hurling Championship (1): 1930
Munster Minor Hurling Championship (1): 1930

Dublin
Leinster Senior Hurling Championship (3): 1934, 1942, 1944

Leinster
Railway Cup (3): 1933, 1936, 1941

References

1911 births
Boherlahan-Dualla hurlers
Faughs hurlers
Tipperary inter-county hurlers
Dublin inter-county hurlers
Leinster inter-provincial hurlers
1992 deaths